The Iron Buddha  is a 1970  Hong Kong ' film directed by Yan Jun and produced by the Shaw Brothers Studio, starring Ling Yun, Fang Ying, Chan Hung-lit, Wong Chung-shun, Yue Wai. The film featured action choreography by Sammo Hung, who also appears in a minor role.

Plot
After attempting to rape the daughter of celebrated kung fu master Liu Peng, Xiao Tianzun is caught and punished, the master leaving a mark on Xiao's body. Years later, Xiao seeks out his revenge and slaughters Liu Peng, his two daughters, and all of the master's disciples save one. Luo Han, the last surviving disciple, decides to avenge his master when he discovers what has happened. To counter Xiao's Evil Poisonous Sword, Luo must find the legendary Hulong Blade. During his journey, Luo saves a damsel-in-distress named Peony and gets into a fight with Master Geng Xian and his goon squad. Having never seen Xiao Tianzun face to face, Luo is deceived when Xiao poses as an ally and tries to steal the Hulong Blade from him. It ends as it must in a final showdown between Xiao Tianzun and Luo Han.

Cast
Ling Yun as Luo Han
Fang Ying as Peony
Chan Hung-lit as Master Geng Xian
Wong Chung-shun as Xiao Tianzun
Yau Ching as Kang's sister
Yue Wai as Kang's sister
Fan Mei-sheng as Master Luo
Fang Mian as servant of Kang family
Goo Man-chung as Uncle Chen / Imperial Guard Wang Qi
Yan Jun as Bao Yilong
Lee Sau-kei as Master Liu Peng
Go Ming as Liu's senior student
Shum Lo as Wang Wu
Chiu Hung as bandit
James Tien as bandit
Chai No as man who leads attack on transport
Nam Wai-lit as escort service man
Cheng Kang-yeh as inn waiter
Yee Kwan as escort service man
Lau Gong as escort service man
Chow Siu-loi as thug
Tam Bo as escort service man
Lee Siu-chung as Geng's man
Tang Ti as Fei Bing
Ma Ying as Xiao's thug
Sammo Hung as Xiao's thug
Man Sau as Aunt Fu
Ng Wai as Aunt Tang
Hao Li-jen as sword maker
Liu Kei as mute girl's father
Chiu Sam-yin as mute girl
Chan Ho as Master Zhang
Gai Yuen as escort service man
Fan Dan as restaurant waiter
Cheung Hei as villager
Billy Chan as Geng's thug
Hoh Wan as bandit
Mama Hung as Aunt Fu's neighbor
Bak Yu as Aunt Fu's neighbor
Lui Hung as Aunt Fu's neighbor
Wong Ching-ho as Official Peng
King Pai-chien as Emperor
Wong Chung
Hsu Hsia
Wong Pau-gei
Hui Gam
Kong Lung
Wong Chi-ming
Chow Kong
Chai Lam
Leung Lung
Gam Tin-chue
Chan Siu-gai
Chui Hing-chun
Wu Por

External links

The Iron Buddha at Hong Kong Cinemagic

1970 films
1970s action films
1970s martial arts films
Hong Kong action films
Hong Kong martial arts films
Wuxia films
Kung fu films
Mandarin-language films
Shaw Brothers Studio films
1970s Hong Kong films